Grove City is an unincorporated community and census-designated place (CDP) in Charlotte County, Florida, United States. The population was 2,174 at the 2020 census. It is part of the Sarasota-Bradenton-Punta Gorda Combined Statistical Area.

History
Grove City was platted in 1886. A post office was established at Grove City in 1887, and remained in operation until 1910.

Geography
Grove City is located in western Charlotte County at  (26.911966, -82.324933). It is bordered by Englewood to the north and by Manasota Key to the west across Lemon Bay, an arm of the Gulf of Mexico. Rotonda West is to the southeast.

Demographics

As of the census of 2000, there were 2,092 people, 1,045 households, and 659 families residing in the CDP. The racial makeup of the CDP was 97.71% White, 0.43% African American, 0.38% Native American, 0.67% Asian, 0.29% from other races, and 0.53% from two or more races. Hispanic or Latino of any race were 0.91% of the population.

There were 1,045 households, out of which 13.5% had children under the age of 18 living with them, 53.3% were married couples living together, 5.6% had a female householder with no husband present, and 36.9% were non-families. 30.0% of all households were made up of individuals, and 18.7% had someone living alone who was 65 years of age or older.  The average household size was 2.00 and the average family size was 2.40.

In the CDP, the population was spread out, with 12.7% under the age of 18, 3.7% from 18 to 24, 17.3% from 25 to 44, 28.3% from 45 to 64, and 38.1% who were 65 years of age or older.  The median age was 58 years. For every 100 females, there were 99.8 males.  For every 100 females age 18 and over, there were 96.9 males.

The median income for a household in the CDP was $32,104, and the median income for a family was $41,976. Males had a median income of $22,685 versus $17,177 for females. The per capita income for the CDP was $21,602.  About 4.9% of families and 9.6% of the population were below the poverty line, including 13.6% of those under age 18 and 6.9% of those age 65 or over.

References

Census-designated places in Charlotte County, Florida
Census-designated places in Florida
Unincorporated communities in Charlotte County, Florida
Unincorporated communities in Florida
Populated places on the Intracoastal Waterway in Florida
1886 establishments in Florida
Populated places established in 1886